James Ballard (born April 16, 1972) is a former American football quarterback.

College career
Ballard was a one-year starter at Wilmington College then transferred after his freshman year to Mount Union College. While at Mount Union, Ballard broke numerous school, conference and NCAA records en route to leading the Purple Raiders to their first ever Division III National Championship in 1993. A two time First-team All-American Team member in 1992 and 1993, and an Honorable Mention All-American in 1991, Jim shattered 17 Division III records and threw for over 12,000 yards and over 150 touchdowns.  The two-time recipient of the Mike Gregory Award, which is given to the Ohio Athletic Conference's top offensive back, he was a three time All-Conference selection and suffered only one OAC loss during his college career. Ballard won the inaugural Melberger Award and the Gagliardi Trophy as Division III's Player of the Year.  He held every Mount Union passing record by the end of his career and still holds the NCAA record for highest number of touchdowns thrown in a playoff game (8). In addition, Jim was selected as the 1993 Joe Fogg Award Winner, given to the top collegiate player in all divisions in the Midwest by the Cleveland Touchdown Club.  In 2008, Jim was inducted into the College Football Hall of Fame. Ballard was an All-American at Mount Union College.

References

External links
 Ballard wins 1993 Melberger Award

1972 births
Living people
American football quarterbacks
American players of Canadian football
Canadian football quarterbacks
Buffalo Bills players
Buffalo Destroyers players
Indiana Firebirds players
Las Vegas Outlaws (XFL) players
London Monarchs players
Mount Union Purple Raiders football players
Scottish Claymores players
Saskatchewan Roughriders players
Toronto Argonauts players
Wilmington Quakers football players
College Football Hall of Fame inductees
People from Cuyahoga Falls, Ohio
Players of American football from Ohio
Players of Canadian football from Ohio
American expatriate players of American football